Maurice Kennedy (born 16 October 1988) is a Fijian professional rugby league footballer who plays as a scrum half or stand off for the Mount Pritchard Mounties in the NSW Cup and Fiji at international level.

Kennedy is a Fijian international. 
Kennedy's  twin brother John Kennedy also plays for the Mounties and the pair have previously been in the system of the St. George Illawarra Dragons and have also played first grade rugby union.

References

External links
(archived by web.archive.org) NRL profile
(archived by web.archive.org) NSWRL profile
Zero Tackle profile
(archived by web.archive.org) PNG v Fiji

1988 births
Fiji national rugby league team players
Fijian rugby league players
Fijian rugby union players
Living people
Redcliffe Dolphins players
Rugby league five-eighths
Rugby league halfbacks
Windsor Wolves players